Jarosław is  a town in Subcarpathian Voivodeship, Poland.

Jarosław may also refer to:
 Jarosław (given name), a given name (and list of people with the name)
Jarosław, Lower Silesian Voivodeship (south-west Poland)
Jarosław County
Jarosławice, Lower Silesian Voivodeship (south-west Poland)
Jarosław, West Pomeranian Voivodeship (north-west Poland)

See also
 Jaroslav (disambiguation)
 Yaroslav (disambiguation)